Lytvensky is a rural locality (a settlement) in Alexandrovskoye Urban Settlement, Alexandrovsky District, Perm Krai, Russia. The population was 419 as of 2010. There are 8 streets.

Geography 
Lytvensky is located 6 km southwest of Alexandrovsk (the district's administrative centre) by road. Alexandrovsk is the nearest rural locality.

References 

Rural localities in Alexandrovsky District